Lianshan may refer to:

Lianshan District (连山区), Huludao, Liaoning
Lianshan Zhuang and Yao Autonomous County (连山壮族瑶族自治县), Qingyuan, Guangdong
Lianshan, Fuchuan County (莲山镇), town in Fuchuan Yao Autonomous County, Guangxi
Lianshan, Pulandian (莲山镇), town in Liaoning
Lianshan, Huitong (连山乡), a township of Huitong County, Hunan.
 Lianshan (連山), one of the three ancient Chinese divinatory texts, along with Guicang (歸藏) and Zhouyi (周易).